The following is a list of Czech exonyms, that is to say names for places that do not speak Czech that have been adapted to Czech phonological system and spelling rules, or are simply native names from ancient times. Note that a large number of the names on the list below are archaic, no longer in use in contemporary Czech.

Exonyms should not be confused with romanization, i.e., transliteration of names using a different script into a variant of the Latin alphabet according to a given set of rules. The Czech language usually employs different romanization systems than English (for example, the standard Czech romanization of the Chinese name 青岛 is Čching-tao, as opposed to its Hanyu Pinyin transliteration Qīngdǎo or to Wade–Giles Ch'ing-tao).

Notes

References

See also
List of European exonyms

Czech language
Lists of exonyms